British midland may refer to:
British Midland Airways Limited, also referred to as bmi and formerly as British Midland
The English Midlands, the central region of Great Britain